German Women - German Faithfulness (German: Deutsche Frauen - Deutsche Treue) is a 1927 German silent drama film directed by Wolfgang Neff and starring Eugen Neufeld, Philipp Manning and Helga Thomas. Its title is taken from the second verse of the German national anthem.

The film's sets were designed by Artur Günther.

Cast
 Eugen Neufeld as Oberst Wolfram  
 Philipp Manning as Major Stürmer  
 Helga Thomas as Gisela, seine Tochter  
 Hermine Sterler as Regine Vollrath  
 Carl Walther Meyer as Leutnant Günther Vollrath, ihr Sohn 
 Geza L. Weiss as Emil, sein Bursche  
 Sophie Pagay as Marie, Haushälterin bei Regine  
 Fritz Kampers as Max Hühnerbein, Musketier 
 Hermann Picha as Heinrich Taube, Gastwirt  
 Lydia Potechina as Frau Taube  
 Gottfried Hagedorn as Ein deutscher Stabsarzt  
 Ferdinand von Alten as Vaughan, französischer Stabsarzt  
 Adele Sandrock as Madame Viard  
 Solveig Hedengran as Marcelle, ihre Enkelin

References

Bibliography
 Michael A. Loveless, Weimar Cinema: A Memorial to the Great War. 2005. Proquest,

External links

1927 films
Films of the Weimar Republic
German silent feature films
Films directed by Wolfgang Neff
German drama films
1927 drama films
German black-and-white films
Silent drama films
1920s German films
1920s German-language films